The Extravehicular Mobility Unit (EMU) is an independent anthropomorphic spacesuit that provides environmental protection, mobility, life support, and communications for astronauts performing extravehicular activity (EVA) in Earth orbit. Introduced in 1981, it is a two-piece semi-rigid suit, and is currently one of two types of EVA spacesuits used by crew members on the International Space Station (ISS), the other being the Russian Orlan space suit. It was used by NASA's Space Shuttle astronauts prior to the end of the  Shuttle program in 2011.

Suit components

The EMU, like the Apollo/Skylab A7L spacesuit, was the result of 21 years of research and development. It consists of a Hard Upper Torso (HUT) assembly, a Primary Life Support System (PLSS) which incorporates the life support and electrical systems, arm sections, gloves, an Apollo-style "bubble" helmet, the Extravehicular Visor Assembly (EVVA), and a soft Lower Torso Assembly (LTA), incorporating the Body Seal Closure (BSC), waist bearing, brief, legs, and boots. Prior to donning the pressure garment, the crew member puts on a Maximum Absorbency Garment (MAG) (basically a modified incontinence diaper – Urine Collection Devices (UCDs) are no longer used), and possibly a Thermal Control Undergarment (long johns). The final item donned before putting on the pressure suit is the Liquid Cooling and Ventilation Garment (LCVG), which incorporates clear plastic tubing through which chilled liquid water flows for body temperature control, as well as ventilation tubes for waste gas removal.

After donning the LCVG, the astronaut then puts on the LTA, before entering the airlock. The astronaut then dons the HUT, connects the LCVG umbilical to the umbilical in the HUT, and then locks the two parts of the suit together using the Body Seal Closure. Once the suit is turned on and checked out, the astronaut dons a "Snoopy cap", a brown and white fabric communications cap dating back to the Apollo days, which incorporates a pair of earphones and microphones, allowing the EVA astronaut to communicate with both the crew members in the orbiter and ground controllers in Houston. After donning the "Snoopy cap", the gloves and helmet are then locked on, pressurizing the suit. A typical EMU can support an astronaut for 8.5 hours, including 30 minutes of reserves in the case of primary life support failure. For EVAs on board the ISS, the astronaut must pre-breathe for about four hours.

Specifications

Baseline EMU
Manufacturer: ILC Dover (suit) and Collins Aerospace (primary life support systems)
Missions: STS-6 (1983) to STS-110 (2002)
Function: orbital extra-vehicular activity
Operating pressure: 4.5 psi (29.6 kPa)
EVA suit weight: 109 lb (49.4 kg)
Total shuttle EVA suit weight: 254 lb (115 kg)
Primary life support: 8 hours (480 minutes)
Backup life support: 30 minutes

Enhanced EMU
Manufacturer: ILC Dover (suit), Collins Aerospace (primary life support systems) and NASA (SAFER)
Missions: 1998 to present
Function: orbital extra-vehicular activity
Operating pressure: 4.5 psi (29.6 kPa)
EVA suit weight: 122 lb (55.3 kg)
Total shuttle EVA suit weight: 275 lb (124.7 kg)
Total ISS EVA suit weight: 319 lb (145 kg)
Primary life support: 8 hours (480 minutes)
Backup life support: 30 minutes

Manufacturer
The EMU hardware and accessories (PLSS, helmet, communications cap, and locking rings for the helmet and gloves), is manufactured by Hamilton Standard (now the Hamilton Sundstrand division of Collins Aerospace) out of Windsor Locks, Connecticut, while the suit's soft components (the arms of the HUT and the entire LTU) are produced by ILC Dover (a former division of Playtex) out of Frederica, Delaware. The two companies, who were rivals during the early days of Apollo for the contract to build the "Block II" (moonwalking) space suit, teamed up in 1974 against the David Clark Company and Garrett AiResearch for the EMU development and construction. During Apollo, the ILC Dover-produced A7L used the life support backpack, helmet, and locking rings supplied by Hamilton Standard, but originally, ILC Dover was to just supply the arms and legs of the suit, a similar process that is still going on today.

In total 18 EMU suits with PLSS were manufactured; 5 were lost during missions, 1 was lost in ground test, and, as of 2017, 11 remain complete and functional.

History
Upon receiving the contract to build the EMU in 1974, Hamilton Standard and ILC Dover delivered the first EMU units to NASA in 1982. During the research and development phase (1975–1980), a suit being tested caught fire, injuring a technician and forcing a redesign on the regulator and circulation fan. On STS-4 in July 1982, the astronauts practiced donning and doffing the suit in the Shuttle's airlock. The first Shuttle EVA was to occur on STS-5, but an electrical failure on the circulation fan forced the EVA to be cancelled. The first EVA of the new EMU finally occurred on STS-6 when Story Musgrave and Donald Peterson went out in the payload bay of the Space Shuttle Challenger and tested techniques to lower the launch cradle of a solid-fuel upper stage used to boost a Tracking and Data Relay Satellite (TDRS-A) into a geostationary orbit.

Other EVAs followed on the Shuttle, notably those on STS-41-B (the first Manned Maneuvering Unit flight), STS-41-C (the Solar Max repair mission), STS-41-G (the first American EVA involving a woman), and STS-51-A (where two stranded satellites were retrieved and returned to Earth), but the majority of EMU uses occurred on the servicing missions of the Hubble Space Telescope. For those flights, two sets of EVA astronauts would venture out of the orbiter, thus requiring NASA to fly four sets of suits (along with repair parts). 41 EVAs using EMUs had been conducted out of the Space Shuttle airlock prior to the start of ISS assembly in November 1998.

With the building of the ISS, Hamilton Sundstrand and ILC Dover refined the existing Shuttle EMU by making the suit modular. This allowed an EMU to be left on the ISS for up to two years and resized on-orbit to fit various crew members. The ISS EMUs also have increased battery capacity, the Simplified Aid For EVA Rescue (SAFER), improved cameras and radios, and a new caution and warning system. Another feature incorporated into the ISS suits is an additional battery to power heaters built into the glove, allowing astronauts to keep their hands warm during nighttime passages on each 95-minute orbit.

Currently, the ISS EMUs and the Russian Orlan suits are used by crews of all nationalities on the International Space Station. The two EMUs are stored within the Quest Joint Airlock.

Future use and replacement
, NASA plans to use Exploration Extravehicular Mobility Unit (xEMU) system during Artemis program, derived from the spacesuit technologies used in the past.

On June 1st, 2022, NASA announced it had selected Axiom Space and Collins Aerospace to develop and provide astronauts with next generation spacesuit and spacewalk systems to work outside the International Space Station, explore the lunar surface on Artemis missions, and prepare for human missions to Mars.

Gallery

Notes

References

External links

Learn About Spacesuits NASA
 ILC Spacesuits & Related Products
 Suited for Spacewalking Teacher's Guide
 NASA EMU PDF
 Shuttle Mission Images
 Donning a Spacesuit
 EMU Video

American spacesuits
Extravehicular activity